Qingzhou or Qing Prefecture was a zhou (prefecture) in imperial China centering on modern Qingzhou, Shandong, China. It existed (intermittently) from 596 to 1125.

Qing Prefecture was named after Qing Province, one of the Nine Provinces of ancient China. The modern city of Qingzhou retains its name.

Geography
The administrative region of Qingzhou in the Tang dynasty is in modern northern Shandong. It probably includes parts of modern: 
Under the administration of Weifang:
Weifang
Qingzhou
Shouguang
Changyi
Linqu County
Changle County
Under the administration of Dongying:
Guangrao County
Under the administration of Binzhou:
Boxing County

References
 

Prefectures of the Sui dynasty
Prefectures of the Tang dynasty
Prefectures of the Song dynasty
Prefectures of Later Liang (Five Dynasties)
Prefectures of Later Han (Five Dynasties)
Prefectures of Later Jin (Five Dynasties)
Prefectures of Later Tang
Prefectures of Later Zhou
Former prefectures in Shandong